Vladislava is a female given name.

Those bearing it include:
Vladislava Ovcharenko (born 1986), Tajikistani track and field sprinter
Vladislava Evtushenko (born 1996), Russian actress, dancer, model, beauty pageant
Vladislava Tancheva (born 1987), Bulgarian rhythmic gymnast
Vladislava Đorđević (born 1974), Serbian actress and voice actress
Vladislava Urazova (born 2004), Russian artistic gymnast

See also
Vladislav

References

Slavic-language names